"The Drowned and the Saved" is the nineteenth-season finale of the long-running legal drama Law & Order. The episode had 7.99 million viewers in the Nielsen ratings.

Development
Inspired by the corruption charges against Illinois Governor Rod Blagojevich, the episode concludes the storyline begun in "Excalibur."

Plot
The murder of a prominent charity executive leads Detectives Lupo and Bernard down a twisted path of political intrigue. The detectives discover a connection between the murdered executive's secretary, her ex-boyfriend and a top politician's wife. The investigation takes a turn when claims of stalking and blackmail surface, revealing a secret desire for a newly vacated seat in the US Senate.

Reception
David Hinckley writes that the "subtly titled 'The Drowned and the Saved,' feels at times self-indulgent. The drama itself, by 'L&O' standards, gets a little heavy-handed and clunky."

References

External links
IMDb.com

Law & Order episodes
2009 American television episodes